The National Basketball League (NKL), also known as 7bet-NKL for sponsorship reasons, is the second-tier basketball minor league in Lithuania. It is placed below the top division Lietuvos krepšinio lyga (LKL). The competition currently consists of 14 teams. The champions of the league have the option to promote to the LKL. However, this rarely happens, as most clubs do not meet the requirements for budget and seating capacity.

History
The league was established in 2005, when the second division LKAL (Lietuvos Krepšinio A Lyga, Lithuanian Basketball A League) was abolished and split into two divisions, the NKL, which is its direct successor, and the newly founded third division RKL.

Current teams

League champions

Titles by club

References

External links
 Official website of National Basketball League 

Basketball leagues in Lithuania
2005 establishments in Lithuania
Sports leagues established in 2005
Lith
Professional sports leagues in Lithuania